Cellettes is the name of the following communes in France:

 Cellettes, Charente, in the Charente department
 Cellettes, Loir-et-Cher, in the Loir-et-Cher department

See also
 La Cellette (disambiguation)